Ohrigstad Dam is a rockfill type dam located close to Ohrigstad in Mpumalanga, South Africa. It was established in 1955 and serves primarily for irrigation purposes. The hazard potential of the dam has been ranked high (3).

See also
List of reservoirs and dams in South Africa

References 

 List of South African Dams from the Department of Water Affairs

Dams in South Africa
Dams completed in 1955
Olifants River (Limpopo)
1955 establishments in South Africa